Giovanni Dall'Igna (born 16 August 1972 in Malo) is a retired Italian professional footballer who played as a defender.

Honours
Sampdoria
 Serie A champion: 1990–91.
 Coppa Italia winner: 1993–94.

1972 births
Living people
Italian footballers
Serie A players
Serie B players
Serie C players
S.P.A.L. players
U.C. Sampdoria players
U.S. Cremonese players
Bologna F.C. 1909 players
Ravenna F.C. players
Spezia Calcio players
S.S.D. Varese Calcio players
Tritium Calcio 1908 players
Association football defenders